Mochlus is a genus of skinks, lizards in the family Scincidae. The genus is endemic to Africa.

Description
Skinks of the genus Mochlus are cylindrical in shape and robust. They get the common name "writhing skinks" from the side-to-side movement that they make when held in the hand.

Diet
Skinks in the genus Mochlus feed on insects and millipedes.

Species
The following 19 species are recognized as being valid.
Mochlus brevicaudis 
Mochlus fernandi  – fire skink
Mochlus grandisonianus  – Lanza's writhing skink
Mochlus guineensis  – Guinean forest skink
Mochlus hinkeli  – Hinkel's red-sided skink, Hinkel's red-flanked skink
Mochlus laeviceps (W. Peters, 1874) – common writhing skink 
Mochlus lanceolatus Broadley, 1990 – Broadley's writhing skink
Mochlus mabuiiformis  – Mabuya-like writhing skink
Mochlus mafianus  – mafia writhing skink
Mochlus mocquardi  – Mocquard's writhing skink
Mochlus paedocarinatus  – Lanza's writhing skink, Abyssinian writhing skink
Mochlus pembanus Boettger, 1913 – Pemba Island writhing skink
Mochlus productus  – Boulenger's writhing skink
Mochlus simonettai  – Simonetta's writhing skink
Mochlus somalicus  – Somali writhing skink
Mochlus striatus 
Mochlus sundevallii  – Sundevall's writhing skink
Mochlus tanae  – Loveridge's writhing skink, Tana River writhing skink
Mochlus vinciguerrae  – Vinciguerra's writhing skink

Nota bene: A binomial authority in parentheses indicates that the species was originally described in a genus other than Mochlus.

References

Further reading
Günther A (1864). "Report on a Collection of Reptiles and Fishes made by Dr. Kirk in the Zambesi and Nyassa Regions". Proc. Zool. Soc. London 1864: 303–314. (Mochlus, new genus, p. 308).

 
Lizard genera
Taxa named by Albert Günther